Bjarne Kjørberg (22 June 1916 – 12 December 1969) was a Norwegian politician for the Christian Democratic Party.

He served as a deputy representative to the Norwegian Parliament from Rogaland during the terms 1965–1969 and 1969–1973. He died shortly into the second term.

References

1916 births
1969 deaths
Christian Democratic Party (Norway) politicians
Deputy members of the Storting